The Netherlands was represented by Heddy Lester, with the song "De mallemolen", at the 1977 Eurovision Song Contest, which took place in London on 7 May. Lester was the winner of the Dutch national final for the contest, held on 2 February.

Before Eurovision

Nationaal Songfestival 1977 

The final was held at the Congresgebouw in The Hague, hosted by Ati Dijckmeester. Ten songs took part and voting was by eleven "celebrity" juries of nine people based in each Dutch province. Each juror awarded one point to his/her favourite song, with 99 points available in total. "De mallemolen" emerged the winner by a 5-point margin.

At Eurovision 
On the night of the final Lester performed 3rd in the running order, following Monaco and preceding Austria. "De mallemolen" had been one of the front-runners in pre-contest betting, but at the close of voting had managed to muster only 35 points, placing the Netherlands 12th of the 18 entries. The Dutch jury awarded its 12 points to Belgium.

The Dutch conductor at the contest was Harry van Hoof.

Voting

References

External links 
 Dutch Preselection 1977

1977
Countries in the Eurovision Song Contest 1977
Eurovision